Eric Burnell Zentner (February 20, 1981 – March 26, 2011) was an American male fashion model active primarily in the 2000s.
He was known for his appearances in ad campaigns for fashion brands such as Versace and Louis Vuitton, and also in Katy Perry's music video for "Hot N Cold".

Career
Zentner was born in Winters, California. He began professional modeling at the age of 19. According to an interview he'd given to the Punk Globe magazine, he was discovered while walking into a Red Robin restaurant when he was 19.

He worked with the likes of Versace, H&M and Macy's as well as walked in shows for Marc Jacobs, Louis Vuitton and Gucci. He was best known for his work with Versace, Louis Vuitton, Marc Jacobs, and for a cameo appearance in Katy Perry's "Hot N Cold" music video.

He also appeared in ad campaigns for Nike and K-Swiss in his later years.

Death
On March 26, 2011, Zentner, reportedly en route to visit his mother in Sacramento, was killed in a hit-and-run accident in Buellton, California. He was 30.

See also
List of people who died in road accidents

References

External
"Eric Zentner" Internet Movie Database
"Eric Zentner" ModelMayhem
"ERIC ZENTNER" Punk Globe

Male models from California
1981 births
2011 deaths
People from Winters, California
Road incident deaths in California